Róbert Boženík (born 18 November 1999) is a Slovak professional footballer who plays as a forward for Primeira Liga club Boavista, on loan from Eredivisie club Feyenoord, and the Slovakia national team.

Club career

MŠK Žilina

2018–19 season
Boženík made his professional Fortuna Liga debut for Žilina against Nitra on 28 July 2018. Žilina won the game 2–1 and although Boženík was replaced by Filip Balaj 73 minutes into the match, he scored the winning goal for the Šošoni in the 54th minute, after an assist by Jakub Holúbek. Within a month of his debut, he also scored against AS Trenčín and iClinic Sereď. Before the winter break he had scored 10 goals, including one against later champions Slovan Bratislava in a 2–5 defeat and 2 further goals against Nitra, in a 2–0 victory. He was named Fortuna Liga's player of the month for October 2018. He was also praised for his successful spell and was crowned one of the league's greatest talents after the autumn part of the 2018–19 season by experts in the media, as well as fans. On 1 December 2018, MŠK had announced a contract extension until June 2022.

In the spring part of the season, Boženík struggled to reclaim his form from the previous months. Still, in the final round of the main part of the Fortuna Liga season, in the match against ŽP Šport Podbrezová, Boženík had replaced Filip Balaj in the 76th minute and scoring the decisive goal, to seal the 2–1 win for Žilina, less than a minute later. Since then, it took Boženík 9 league fixtures to score again. He did score two goals in Slovnaft Cup, one in second-leg semi-final match against Zemplín Michalovce and another one in the unsuccessful final match against FC Spartak Trnava (Boženík was also one of the players who missed a penalty in the shoot-out). In the league, however, it took him  months to score again, scoring two against Ružomberok in final match of the season, in a 4–2 win.

Overally, Boženík completed the season with 15 goals in 39 competitive games for Žilina. With 13 goals in the Fortuna Liga, he was the second best scorer of the season, behind Andraž Šporar (29 goals).

After the season, in early June, as Boženík had been preparing for a double fixture against Jordan and Azerbaijan, it was reported that season's Belgian champions, K.R.C. Genk, have shown interest in both Boženík and his national team team-mate and Viktoria Plzeň midfielder, Patrik Hrošovský. Žilina had apparently requested a transfer fee of 4 million Eur. This would have made Boženík Žilina's third most expensive departure and 4th in the history of Fortuna liga, only behind Bénes, Hancko and Dubovský, but ahead of players like Nemanja Matić, Tomáš Hubočan or Slovakia's second most capped national team player Miroslav Karhan.

2019–20 season
Based on past season's performances, Boženík was expected to rank among Fortuna Liga's leading top scorers in the new season as well. Instead, Ján Bernát, a young, then 18 year old attacking midfielder, also playing for MŠK Žilina, co-headed the top scorer's table until Round 8, with 5 goals to his name. In the same time period, Boženík only scored two goals against Ružomberok and Senica. His goal against Senica, in a 5–0 win of 31 August 2019, had contributed MŠK's rise to the top of the Fortuna Liga table. Boženík also managed to score against competition's novice, FK Pohronie, on 21 September 2019, securing the 2–1 victory, along with Filip Kaša. This turned out to be Boženík's last goal with the club, as he did not score in the leagues upcoming 7 fixtures.

During this half-season spent at pod Dubňom, he recorded 3 goals in 16 league fixtures. At the same point in the previous season, he recorded 10 goals. 
He also made a single appearance in Slovnaft Cup, coming on as a tactical substitute to avoid an upset elimination, in a match against Odeva Lipany, playing in 3. Liga East. Žilina narrowly won 1–0, after a goal by Patrik Myslovič. During a yellow-card suspension, Boženík was also featured in a single 2. liga fixture against Komárno (1–1), for MŠK reserve squad, on 27 October 2019. He secured the point for MŠK with a late equaliser.

Feyenoord
On 27 January 2020, Boženík signed a -year contract with Dutch club Feyenoord for a fee €4.6 million. Sporting Director Frank Arnesen described Boženík as "a young but big talent who will be given the time to grow and develop here". As his preferred number 9 jersey was taken by Danish forward Nicolai Jørgensen, Boženík had opted for number 19.

While he did not feature in the KNVB Cup fixture against Fortuna Sittard on the following day, Boženík marked his Eredivisie debut at De Kuip on 1 February 2020 against Emmen. Feyenoord won the game 3–0, after goals by Oğuzhan Özyakup, Nicolai Jørgensen and Luis Sinisterra. The last was replaced by Boženík in the 82nd minute, with the final score already set. Still, despite the short play-time, it was noted that Boženík managed to develop few chances to score. He scored his first goal for the club on 16 February 2020, putting Feyenoord up 3–4 in the 88th minute in the away game against PEC Zwolle to secure the three points.

Loan to Boavista 
On 13 July 2022, Feyenoord announced the loan of Bozeník to Boavista, with a future option to buy.

International career
On 18 October 2018, during a press conference when former coach of the Slovak national team had explained his decision to resign, he referred to Boženík as ' Rohožník ' (a village in the Malacky District of western Slovakia). Kozák claimed, that despite his talent, Boženík was not yet ready for the national team, referring to apparent pressures from Žilina-aligned managers and interest groups. Boženík repeatedly reacted very calmly to the incident, laughing it off as a mistake and declaring concentration on his play and performances. He even claimed, that at first he did not know that Kozák was referring to him.

Boženík made his debut for Slovak national team on 7 June 2019 in a friendly against Jordan, as a half-time substitute for Pavol Šafranko.

Boženík scored his first international goal against Hungary in a tense qualifying derby fixture on 9 September 2019. After a physical match, in which he suffered numerous tackles, Boženík was commended by media and fans for the winning goal and the gameplay. On 13 October 2019, he was commended once again, after scoring the only goal of Slovakia in a friendly against Paraguay. The game was a farewell game for defenders Martin Škrtel, Tomáš Hubočan and forward Adam Nemec. Nemec starred in the starting XI but was replaced by Boženík after about half an hour. Slovakia's leading goal scorer of the previous years Nemec had said, that he sees great future and a possible replacement in Boženík, adding that the youngster will require numerous similar games to mature. To score the goal, Boženík utilised a pass from László Bénes, but Slovakia merely tied the game 1–1.

Career statistics

Club

International 

Scores and results list Slovakia's goal tally first, score column indicates score after each Boženík goal.

Honours
Individual
Peter Dubovský Award: 2019

References

External links
 
 
 MŠK Žilina official club profile
 Futbalnet profile
 
 Ligy.sk profile

1999 births
Living people
People from Žilina District
Sportspeople from the Žilina Region
Slovak footballers
Slovakia youth international footballers
Slovakia under-21 international footballers
Slovakia international footballers
Association football forwards
MŠK Žilina players
Feyenoord players
Fortuna Düsseldorf players
Boavista F.C. players
2. Liga (Slovakia) players
Slovak Super Liga players
Eredivisie players
2. Bundesliga players
Primeira Liga players
Expatriate footballers in the Netherlands
Slovak expatriate sportspeople in the Netherlands
Expatriate footballers in Germany
Slovak expatriate sportspeople in Germany
Expatriate footballers in Portugal
UEFA Euro 2020 players
Slovak expatriate sportspeople in Portugal